Square Deal Sanderson is a 1919 American silent Western film directed by William S. Hart and Lambert Hillyer, written by Lambert Hillyer and Charles Alden Seltzer, and starring William S. Hart, Ann Little, Frank Whitson, Lloyd Bacon, Edwin Wallock and Tom O'Brien. It was released on June 15, 1919, by Paramount Pictures. A print of the film is held by the Library of Congress and in other film archives.

Plot

Cast 
 William S. Hart as Square Deal Sanderson
 Ann Little as Mary Bransford
 Frank Whitson as Alva Dale
 Lloyd Bacon as Barney Owen 
 Edwin Wallock as Maison
 Tom O'Brien as Williams
 Andrew Robson as Judge Graney

References

External links 

 
 

1919 films
1919 Western (genre) films
Paramount Pictures films
Films directed by Lambert Hillyer
Films directed by William S. Hart
American black-and-white films
Surviving American silent films
Silent American Western (genre) films
1910s English-language films
1910s American films